Rob Kleinsman (born 15 November 1962) is a former Dutch racing cyclist. He rode in the 1989 Tour de France.

References

External links

1962 births
Living people
Dutch male cyclists
Sportspeople from Hengelo
Cyclists from Overijssel